Carl Rimmer (born 29 April 1986 in Banbury, England) is a Rugby Union player for Exeter Chiefs in the Aviva Premiership.

Rimmer is equally capable of playing at both loosehead and tighthead prop and made his debut for Exeter against London Welsh on 16 September 2012, subsequently starting at both loosehead and tighthead. Rimmer joined Exeter from fellow westcountry side Cornish Pirates and is qualified to play for both England or Wales. He was a replacement as Exeter Chiefs defeated Wasps to be crowned champions of the 2016-17 English Premiership.

References

External links
Chiefs profile
ESPN Scrum Profile
Aviva Premiership Rugby Player Profile

1986 births
Living people
English rugby union players
Rugby union players from Banbury
Cornish Pirates players
Rugby union props